Lopholeptosphaeria is a genus of fungi in the class Dothideomycetes. The familial placement of this taxon is unknown (incertae sedis). The genus was circumscribed by Manuel Emmanuele de Sousa da Câmara in 1932.

See also 
 List of Dothideomycetes genera incertae sedis

References 

Dothideales
Dothideomycetes genera